Kələki (also, Kalaki, Kalakik and Kyalaki) is a village and municipality in the Ordubad District of Nakhchivan, Azerbaijan. It is located on the Ordubad-Unus highway, 45 km in the north-east from the district center. People of the village is busy with gardening, vegetable-growing, animal husbandry. There are secondary school, club, library and a medical center in the village. It has a population of 463.

History 
Kələki is a village of the Ordubad district in the administrative unit of the Unus village, on the bank of the Vənəndçay river, on the foothill of the Uçurdağ mountain. The village got its name from the nearby ruins of the temple. The name made out the words in  Arabic-language "kala" (temple) and in Persian-language, the word "ki" (mountain) of the phonetic version of "kuh" and means "temple mountain".

The village had an Armenian church (St. Stepanos Church), which continued to exist until the early 2000s and it was destroyed at some point between 2000 and 2009.

Notable natives 
 Abulfaz Elchibey (24 June 1938 – 22 August 2000), ex-president of Azerbaijan Republic.

See also 
 St. Stepanos Church (Kələki)

References

External links 

Populated places in Ordubad District